Andrei Aleksandrovich Rumyantsev (born 14 August 1969) is a former Russian professional footballer.

Club career
He made his professional debut in the Soviet Second League in 1987 for FC Lokomotiv Gorky.

References

1969 births
Sportspeople from Nizhny Novgorod
Living people
Soviet footballers
Russian footballers
Association football defenders
FC Lokomotiv Nizhny Novgorod players
FC SKA Rostov-on-Don players
FC Baltika Kaliningrad players
FC Kuban Krasnodar players
FC Aktobe players
Russian Premier League players
Kazakhstan Premier League players
Russian expatriate footballers
Expatriate footballers in Kazakhstan
Russian expatriate sportspeople in Kazakhstan